The women's changquan three events combined competition (changquan, short weapon, long weapon) at the 1990 Asian Games in Beijing, China was held from 1 to 4 October at the Haidian Gymnasium.

Schedule

Results 
A few results have been preserved.

References 

Women's_changquan